Woman is an album by Burt Bacharach in collaboration with the Houston Symphony Orchestra, released in 1979 on A&M Records. It was recorded live by Bacharach and the orchestra during a four-hour recording session on November 2, 1978, at Jones Hall in Houston, Texas. The project was originally conceived by Bacharach and Michael Woolcock. Guest vocalists included Carly Simon on the song "I Live In The Woods", Libby Titus on the song "Riverboat", and Sally Stevens on the song "There Is Time".

Critical reception
The Washington Post called the album "an ambitious but mostly ignored collection of jazzlike orchestra music performed by the Houston Symphony." The Rolling Stone Album Guide called it a "semi-classical epic" and Bacharach's "most ambitious work."

Track listing
All tracks composed by Burt Bacharach; except where indicated
 "Summer of '77"– 3:55
 "Woman"– 7:07
 "Riverboat" (Bacharach, Libby Titus)– 3:26
 "Magdalena"– 6:54
 "New York Lady"– 6:31
 "There Is Time" (Bacharach, Sally Stevens)– 6:36
 "The Dancing Fool" (Bacharach, Anthony Newley)– 2:12
 "I Live in the Woods" (Bacharach, Carly Simon, Libby Titus)– 6:04

Personnel
Burt Bacharach - vocals, arrangements, conductor
Libby Titus - vocals on "Riverboat"
Carly Simon - vocals on "I Live in the Woods"
Sally Stevens - vocals on "There Is Time"
Houston Symphony Orchestra - orchestra
Ann White, Marti McCall, Sally Stevens - backing vocals
Ronald Patterson - concertmaster
Technical
Armin Steiner, Linda Tyler - engineer

References

1979 live albums
A&M Records live albums
Burt Bacharach albums